Michel Félibien (14 September 1665 – 25 September 1719) was a French historian, who wrote a five-volume history of Paris, unfinished at his death, but completed by Guy-Alexis Lobineau and published in 1725.

He was the son of the French historian André Félibien and in 1683 became a Benedictine monk in the Congregation of Saint Maur (known for their high level of scholarship) at the Abbey of Saint-Germain-des-Prés in Paris. He is also known for his history of the Royal Abbey of Saint-Denis, published in 1706. This book contains five engraved prints depicting objects from the treasury of the abbey, now mostly missing.

References
Notes

 
Sources
 Félibien, Michel (1706). Histoire de l'abbaye royale de Saint-Denys en France. Paris: Frederic Leonard. Copy at Google Books.
 Félibien, Michel (1725). Histoire de la ville de Paris, completed and enlarged by Guy-Alexis Lobineau. Paris: Guillaume Desprez. Volumes 1, 2, 3, 4, and 5 at Google Books. Volumes  1, 2, 3, 4, and 5 at INHA.

1665 births
1719 deaths
18th-century French historians
Congregation of Saint-Maur